John Jacob Cannell, M.D. (born June 21, 1948, Washington, D.C.) is an American doctor. An anti-smoking activist, Cannell was featured in the New York Times in the 1980s for turning away smokers from his clinic in West Virginia. Cannell founded a nonprofit group to address perceived problems with educational testing. Cannell has described several hypotheses regarding the health benefits of Vitamin D and is the founder of the Vitamin D Council.

Background

Cannell is the son of the late imagist poet Skipwith Cannell. In 1972, he graduated from the University of Maryland, College Park with a degree in Zoology. He attended medical school at the University of North Carolina at Chapel Hill and graduated in 1976. He is a member of the American Medical Association and became a board-certified psychiatrist in 1993.

Anti-smoking stance
In 1988, The New York Times reported that Cannell, a doctor in Beaver, West Virginia, had taken a "novel stand" against smoking. In local advertisements, Cannell pledged to turn away from his clinic patients who were smokers. He granted an exception to those needing emergency care. Cannell's stance received praise from some medical colleagues, while others criticised his approach as fraught with potential ethical problems.

Educational reform efforts
Cannell, noticing discrepancies between his young patients' performance in school and their grade level, formed the nonprofit Friends for Education to study the reported test score rankings of poverty-stricken states such as Mississippi, Louisiana, Arkansas, South Carolina, Tennessee, Georgia and Kentucky. Cannell found that all were reportedly "above the national average." Cannell extended the results to all 50 states, each of which was said to be above average. Cannell's findings prompted wider study of the issue and were reported in the national press including the New York Times, NBC News and the Wall Street Journal.

Friends for Education filed sexual discrimination complaints against Raleigh County and the West Virginia State Department of Education, claiming women held 80% of the low paying teaching jobs, but men held 80% of the higher paying administrative positions.

Friends for Education also advertised a "Dirtiest Public School in West Virginia Contest," the winner of which would receive $100.00 worth of mops, brooms, and soap from Friends for Education.

The Vitamin D Council
Cannell has hypothesised that Vitamin D deficiencies may predispose to influenza. In the controversial and non-peer-reviewed journal Medical Hypotheses, Cannell also suggested a tie to autism. He founded the Vitamin D Council as a tax exempt, nonprofit, 501(c)(e) corporation and is its executive director.

Bibliography

References

External links
Vitamin D Council
A Tribute to John J. Cannell, M.D.
The Source of Lake Wobegon
Point-Counterpoint: The Lake Wobegon Effect Twenty Years Later

Living people
1948 births